HMS Patrol was one of two  scout cruisers which served built for the Royal Navy in the first decade of the 20th century. The ship was in reserve for most of the first decade of her existence. After the beginning of the First World War in August 1914, she was assigned to coastal defence duties on the East Coast of England. Patrol was badly damaged during the German bombardment of Hartlepool in mid-December 1914 when she attempted to exit the harbour during the bombardment. After repairs were completed she remained on coast defence duties until she was transferred to the Irish Sea in 1918. The ship was paid off in 1919 and sold for scrap in 1920.

Design and description
The Pathfinder-class ships were one of four classes of scout cruisers ordered by the Admiralty in 1902–1903 and 1903–1904 Naval Programmes. These ships were intended to work with destroyer flotillas, leading their torpedo attacks and backing them up when attacked by other destroyers, although they quickly became less useful as destroyer speeds increased before the First World War. Their crew consisted of 289 officers and ratings.

The ships were powered by a pair of three-cylinder triple-expansion steam engines, each driving one shaft, using steam provided by a dozen Laird-Normand boilers.

The main armament of the Pathfinder class consisted of ten quick-firing (QF) 12-pounder  18-cwt guns. Three guns were mounted abreast on the forecastle and the quarterdeck, with the remaining four guns positioned port and starboard amidships. They also carried eight 3-pounder Hotchkiss guns and two above-water 18-inch (450 mm) torpedo tubes, one on each broadside.

Construction and career
Patrol was laid down on 31 October 1903 by Cammell Laird's Birkenhead shipyard. She was launched on 13 October 1904 and completed on 26 September 1905. Not long after completion, two additional 12-pounder guns were added and the 3-pounder guns were replaced with six QF 6-pounder Hotchkiss guns. The ship was in initially in reserve until she was assigned to the Home Fleet in October 1907 and then the 3rd Fleet at the Nore Command in 1908. In 1909 she served a short spell as leader of the 1st Destroyer Flotilla (DF) at Portsmouth, then moved to the 3rd Destroyer Flotilla and was fitted at HM Dockyard, Chatham, in June before rejoining the 1st later in the year. Patrol was back in reserve in 1912. About 1911–1912, her main guns were replaced by nine  guns, arranged four on each broadside and the remaining gun on the quarterdeck. She was stationed at Haulbowline in 1913–14. The ship recommissioned on 27 January 1914 to serve as the leader of the 9th Destroyer Flotilla.

At the beginning of the First World War in August, the 9th DF was protecting the north east coastline between the Firth of Forth and the Tyne. Hartlepool was a tidal harbour, and at low tide it was difficult for the cruisers to get out to sea. On 16 December, the destroyers put out to sea at 05:30 and had reported that the tide was very low and the swell outside the harbour was very high. Brown decided that it was too dangerous for the cruisers and C9 to go out on patrol.

The heavy German ships chased off the hopelessly outgunned destroyers and opened fire on Hartlepool's two coastal artillery batteries, which mounted three  guns, before bombarding the port and harbour entrance. Bruce attempted to leave the harbour, but was engaged by Blücher in the channel to the open sea and hit by two  shells. Four men were killed and seven wounded, and Bruce had to beach his ship. The German ships broke off the raid before finishing off the cruiser. Badly holed, Patrol had taken on too much water to return to Hartlepool, but was able to reach the Middlesbrough docks.

After undergoing extensive repairs she joined the 7th Destroyer Flotilla in the Humber in 1915.  She was transferred to the Irish Sea in 1918 and then back to the 9th DF at the Nore. Surplus to requirements after the end of the war, she was paid off in April 1919 and sold for scrap in April 1920 to Machinehandel, of the Netherlands.

Notes

Footnotes

Bibliography

External links
 Pathfinder class in World War I
 History of HMS Patrol

 

Pathfinder-class cruisers
World War I cruisers of the United Kingdom
1904 ships
Ships built on the River Mersey